Mian Kal (also Romanized as Mīān Kal, Meyān Kal, and Miyan Kal; also known as Mīān Gol) is a village in Meydavud Rural District, Meydavud District, Bagh-e Malek County, Khuzestan Province, Iran. At the 2006 census, its population was 154, in 31 families.

References 

Populated places in Bagh-e Malek County